KLDV (91.1 FM) is a class C0 radio station with a Christian Contemporary format that is licensed to the Educational Media Foundation. It is licensed to Morrison, Colorado, serving the Denver metropolitan area.

External links

Jefferson County, Colorado
LDV
Radio stations established in 1971
1971 establishments in Colorado
K-Love radio stations
Educational Media Foundation radio stations